John Bullock may refer to:

Politicians
John Bullock (1731–1809), MP for Maldon, Steyning and Essex
John Dwight Bullock, member of the Wisconsin State Assembly
John Bullock (MP for Tamworth), see Tamworth (UK Parliament constituency)
John Bullock (died 1740), MP for Maldon (UK Parliament constituency)

Others
John Bullock (bishop), bishop of Ross, 1418
John Bullock (rugby league)
John Bullock (racing driver) in 1984 British Formula Three season
Johnny Bullock, jockey, Festival Trophy Handicap Chase
Jack Bullock, 1959 Grand Prix motorcycle racing season

See also

John Bulloch (disambiguation)